Sergei Pavlovich Tsekov (born 28 September 1953 in Simferopol) is a former Ukrainian and now Russian politician. Since 26 March 2014 he has been a senator of the Federation Council for the legislature of Crimea.

Tsekov was in 1990 a member of the parliament of the Ukrainian Soviet Socialist Republic (Ukrainian SSR). As such he was one of only four deputies who voted against the Declaration of State Sovereignty of Ukraine in July 1990.

He was a chairman of the Verkhovna Rada of Crimea in 1994–1995.

References

External links
 
 Verkhovna Rada website

1953 births
Politicians from Simferopol
Living people
First convocation members of the Verkhovna Rada
Party of Regions politicians
United Russia politicians
Russian individuals subject to European Union sanctions
Members of the Federation Council of Russia (after 2000)